Stanley Duke Trebilco (24 December 1897 – 26 March 1976) was an Australian rules footballer who played for Carlton in the Victorian Football League (VFL) during the 1920s.

Trebilco, who started out at Ulverstone, won the inaugural Cheel Medal in 1923. He then spent two seasons with Carlton and placed well in the Brownlow both years. The 1926 season saw him back in Tasmania, this time as captain-coach of Burnie.

References

External links

Holmesby, Russell and Main, Jim (2007). The Encyclopedia of AFL Footballers. 7th ed. Melbourne: Bas Publishing.

1897 births
Carlton Football Club players
Burnie Football Club players
Ulverstone Football Club players
Australian rules footballers from Tasmania
1976 deaths